Undercliffe may be a reference to:

Places
 Australia
 Undercliffe, New South Wales, a neighbourhood of the Sydney suburb of Earlwood
 England, United Kingdom
 Undercliffe, West Yorkshire, an area of Bradford, England